Errill GAA is a Gaelic Athletic Association gaelic football club in Errill in County Laois, Ireland.

The club colours are green and white. The club grounds on the Roscrea Road are called Pairc Eireil.

The club currently amalgamates at all levels of hurling with neighbouring club Rathdowney and in 2006 the Rathdowney-Errill team won the Laois Senior Hurling Championship for the first time ever.

The Errill club has twice won the Laois Senior Hurling Championship, (1938 and 1952) and won the Laois Intermediate Hurling Championship in 1981. It also won the Laois U-21 B Hurling Championship in 1997.

Although football would be very much a secondary sport in the area, there has been some success with wins in the Laois Junior C Football Championship in 2000 and 2016 and the Laois Junior B Football Championship in 2017 and 2019. Laois All-County Football League Division 5 title was also won in 1998.

Achievements
 Laois Senior Hurling Championship: (2) 1938, 1952
 Laois Intermediate Hurling Championship (1) 1981
 Laois Under-21 B Hurling Championship (1) 1997
 Laois Junior C Football Championship (2) 2000, 2016
 Laois Junior B Football Championship (2) 2017, 2019
 Laois All-County Football League Div. 5: (1) 1988

References

External links
 Club history (archived 2010)

Gaelic games clubs in County Laois